Fish Creek may refer to:

Streams
Canada
 Fish Creek (Alberta), in Fish Creek Provincial Park
 Fish Creek (Saskatchewan), also known as Tourond's Coulee
 Rural Municipality of Fish Creek No. 402, Saskatchewan

 United States
 Fish Creek (Georgia)
 Fish Creek (Kansas)
 Fish Creek (Black River tributary), in New York
 Fish Creek (East Branch Delaware River tributary), in New York
 Fish Creek (Oneida Lake tributary), in New York
 Fish Creek (Oregon), a Recreational River within the National Wild and Scenic Rivers System

Communities
 Australia
 Fish Creek, Victoria

 Canada
 Fish Creek No. 402, Saskatchewan

 United States
 Fish Creek, Wisconsin

Other uses 
 Battle of Fish Creek, part of the North-West Rebellion

See also
 Fishkill (disambiguation)
 List of creeks named Fish Creek